Western-style fast food in mainland China is a fairly recent phenomenon, with Kentucky Fried Chicken (KFC) establishing its first Beijing restaurant in November 1987. This location was met with unprecedented success, and served as a model for many local Chinese restaurants that followed it.

History 
The history of western-style fast food in China dates back to 1906, when "Yili's Fast Food Shop" (义利快餐厅) was established in Beijing as the country's very first fast food restaurant in the Far East of the Asia-Pacific region.
Rapid economic development, and the growth of global trade and cultural exchanges have accelerated changes in people's lifestyles in transitional societies like China. Among these changes, the observed shift in people's food consumption from a traditional diet to a Westernized diet is a result of multiple factors, which may contribute to observed increases in obesity and chronic diseases. Over the past two decades, the fast-food (FF) industry and obesity rates have increased rapidly in China. Pizza Hut and McDonald's were launched in China in September and October 1990, respectively. Three years earlier, KFC was established in mainland China. The first McDonald's in Shenzhen was supplied from Hong Kong from 1990 to 1992. By the time the first McDonald's in Beijing opened in 1992, mainland China had proper infrastructure to supply the restaurants.

As of 2022, there are about 8,600 KFC outlets in more than 850 Chinese cities. Pizza Hut has over 2,800 restaurants in China.

Franchises

Kentucky Fried Chicken

Establishments in Beijing 
KFC, also known as 肯德基, experienced extreme success in China, breaking several world records for restaurants in its early years. KFC's first Beijing restaurant opened in November 1987, and its 500 seats made it the biggest fast food restaurant in the world. In 1988, it fried 2,200 chickens daily and earned more than any other KFC location with a turnover of 14 million yuan. KFC opened 28 restaurants across China in 1994, with seven of them located in Beijing.

Children as a target audience 
KFC quickly found that it appealed strongly to children. Chinese parents reported that they had no preference for any particular fast food restaurant and simply let their children choose. As a result, KFC tried to figure out how to appeal to kids even more. One of the first things KFC found was that children were not at all interested in its logo. In 1995, the bearded, elderly European American man that Chinese children found so off-putting was exchanged for a playful cartoon character dubbed "Chicky." Other efforts to entice children included play areas, child-height sinks, smaller furniture and settings for birthday parties, which were a very recent phenomenon in China. All of these improvements helped the company promote itself among children as a ''fun and exciting place to eat''.

Competition with local Chinese fried-chicken restaurants 
The KFC in Dongsi sits across the street from a Chinese fried-chicken restaurant called "Glorious China Chicken." Despite Glorious China Chicken's cheaper prices, larger portions, choices of rice, soup, and vegetables, and draught beer, the KFC consistently has more customers because of one factor: its hygiene. Regardless of the number of people being served, the Chinese KFC employees constantly clean the restaurant and its bathrooms, so it surpasses the vast majority of China's local restaurants in terms of cleanliness. As a result, Chinese people highly favored KFC and began to complain of other restaurants' lack of bathrooms and general untidiness.

KFC’s success in China 
KFC's brand identity can be identified as customers' different satisfaction on the brand's property, products, presentations, and publications. By analyzing a questionnaire on basic information of eating at KFC in both United States and China, Chinese consumers generally eat more often at KFC and have a more positive impression on it than American consumers do. Chinese consumers prefer the clean space and earlier opening hours of KFC while Americans favor it for being affordable and being a meal instead of a snack. Besides the satisfaction on brand identity, KFC specifically came up with the unique menu only in China where you can easily get different flavors of rice porridge, deep fried dough sticks, and soy milk in the morning.

KFC's localization strategy helped the brand mitigate political risk and overcome various business-related issues. In 2005, KFC was facing negative backlash over the discovery of a carcinogenic dye in two of its chicken products. While this discovery had the potential of ruining the brand's reputation, KFC still managed to increase its profits while opening hundreds of new stores in China that same year. The company's success has been assigned to its China-specific advertising spend and its expertise on the Chinese market and customer base.

Environmental Actions 
Much like other fast food businesses, Kentucky Fried Chicken will look to phase out their usage of plastic products and will instead introduce wooden cutlery and more biodegradable packaging material for their orders. Nonbiodegradable plastic bags will also be removed and instead replaced with biodegradable paper bags that will be used in their delivery and takeout bags. This is all in guidance with other fast food restaurants seeking to follow a plastic reduction plan set by Beijing in 2019.

McDonald's

Establishments in Beijing 
The first McDonald's opened in mainland China in 1990, in the Shenzhen Special Economic Zone. More prominently, the largest McDonald's in the world opened on April 23, 1992, in Beijing. It has 700 seats, 29 cash registers, and served over 40,000 on its opening day. By 1996, 29 McDonald's had opened in Beijing alone. Initially, mainly affluent families ate there to distinguish themselves and as a result McDonald's became a symbol of a new lifestyle of seeking out foreign cultural influences. One of the biggest reasons McDonald's has experienced more success than other fast food restaurants in China is its high standards of hygiene. Beijing media consistently praises McDonald's cleanliness and frames it against the poor hygiene of its competitors.

KFC vs. McDonald's in China 

KFC entered China in 1987 and McDonald's followed only three years later. By 2018, KFC had 5910 outlets in China, while McDonald's owned only 2700. Based on the data collected of the number of outlets opened in Chinese cities from 1987 to 2007, KFC tends to add 0.39 outlets per year in a city. The rate of new open outlets of McDonald's is about half that of KFC's. However, both chains favor big cities and expanded rapidly after 1999. There have been competitions between KFC and McDonald's since they both entered the market and it usually has a positive impact. The rivalry between them not only expands potential demand for western fast food by getting Chinese customers to try, but also affects the size of the market where it can be easily enlarged. In general, rivals help fast food chains to make better location choices. However, net growth rate of McDonald's has a negative effect on the enlargement of KFC. McDonald's opens new locations in the areas based on KFC's expansion. This impact can be observed more in big cities than small ones. McDonald's takes advantage of KFC on where to expand the business, and KFC benefits from McDonald's by growing customer interest on western fast food.

Children as a target audience 
McDonald's also has shown to appeal strongly to children to the extent that there would be areas in McDonald's called “children’s paradise” consisting of children running around and playing. Parents in Hong Kong have been known to use a trip to McDonald's as a reward for good behavior or academic achievement. As a result, McDonald's has cemented themselves as a significant childhood memory.

Big Mac in China 
McDonald's in the 1990s represented the Americana image as well as the promise of modernization. McDonald's strict control over food quality ensured consumers of their cleanliness. Customers also enjoy standardized prices as it brings about an atmosphere of equality, where every customer can get the same level of service and food for the same price. McDonald's meals which usually consist of a burger and fries are interpreted as a snack as traditional Chinese meals consist of rice and a vegetable or meat dish. McDonald's and other foreign fast foods were seen as a treat, especially towards lower income families. As a result, families may save several days of pay to be able to afford to eat at the restaurant. This adds to the perception that McDonald's is not a regular place for meals, rather a cultural experience.

McDonald’s leadership policies 
McDonald's promotion of local national leadership allowed for an easier introduction into the Chinese market. China is known to have fierce competition among global companies for leadership talent as a result McDonald's looks to distinguish themselves by promoting local talent to top positions. 42% of top leadership in McDonald's started out as a crew member.

Scandals 
A McDonald's in Guangzhou, in the Guangdong province underwent widespread criticism for excluding people of African descent from entering their restaurant. This was in response to the introduction of the novel coronavirus with Chinese officials warning about the rise of imported coronavirus cases from Africa. Guangzhou is known to host one of the largest African communities in China.

Environmental Actions 
Beijing Simplot Food Processing, the primary supplier of frozen French fries and potato products to McDonald's in China has been fined a total of 3.9 million yuan ($629,000) for having been caught releasing polluted water into the city's primary water pipes. McDonald's responded by saying they will closely monitor their suppliers and have stated that all suppliers “must comply with all relevant local laws and regulations”. This puts into question how long this practice has been occurring and the sort of environmental as well as health impacts it may have on civilians.

McDonald's have undergone a significant shift in their packaging to support green initiatives in reducing waste and allowing for more “green” packaging. McDonald's is also expected to open 1,800 green restaurants between the years of 2018–2022. McDonald's follows the LEED volume certification set by the U.S. This packaging will be used to reach three goals revolving around responsible packaging, a continuous reduction, and optimization over the materials used.

Burger King

Establishments in Shanghai 
Burger King, also known as 汉堡王(Hànbǎowáng) opened their first chain in Shanghai on June 27, 2005. The Chinese counterpart offered the standard Burger King menu with the Whopper, as well as special offerings to appeal to Chinese tastes such as the Spicy Mala Burger. Burger King in China as of 2012 is backed by TAB Food Investments also known as TFI. TFI currently runs over 1,200 Burger Kings in China making it the largest franchisee owner globally.

Scandals 
Burger King restaurants in the Eastern Jiangxi Province have been accused of having served expired burgers and chicken nuggets by replacing expiration labels, under the instruction of restaurant managers. Burger King China has issued an apology and has promised to investigate this matter at hand.

Burger King's success in China 
Burger King entered during a time where two major food giants, KFC and McDonald's, were competing for control over domestic markets in China. Burger King faced challenges in the domestic market as a significant portion of the population preferred chicken over beef when it came to meat options. As the Whopper was the flagship burger for Burger King, they were forced to adapt to local tastes and found success with chasing younger & more individualistic diners that resided primarily in the country's big cities.

Starbucks

Starbucks in Beijing 
Starbucks, a chain primarily known for their coffee, drinks, and quick service food opened their first store in the China World Trade Building, Beijing in January 1999. As of 2021, Starbucks has opened 5,000 stores in 200 different cities around all of mainland China.

Environmental Actions 
Starbucks follows the ‘GOOD GOOD’ movement that revolves around the transition from plastic straws and unrecyclable materials to more sustainable packaging options like their biodegradable straw that is primarily built using coffee grounds and poly lactic acid. Wooden cutlery will also replace all plastic cutlery as well as offering other reusable server ware for use in-store. Starbucks as a company has set science-based preliminary targets for 50 percent reductions of carbon, water and waste globally by the year of 2030.

Closures 
Starbucks currently has over 4,300 outlets in China and the coronavirus pandemic caused over 2,000 Starbucks locations in China to close either temporarily or permanently during this crisis.

Competition 
China is the largest growing market outside of the U.S. and has been growing at an immense rate since its inception back in 1999. Rise of domestic competition has led to concerns over future profitability within this market. Foreign brands such as illy Caffè and Tim Hortons have also been attempting to erode the market share advantage that Starbucks have been able to establish. As of 2021, Tea drink markets were double the size of that of the coffee market within China. It is reported there are over four times the amount of milk tea and fruit juice stores compared to coffee shops.

Chinese fast-food restaurants vs American fast food 
One reason that Chinese fast-food companies have not been successful in China is that Chinese food in general is already fast and convenient by nature. Chinese people are already used to fast, cheap food, but the exotic nature of American food makes it somewhat more desirable. The second major reason is that McDonald's and KFC establishments in China have placed a massive emphasis on cleanliness to the point that customers would choose them over a Chinese fast-food counterpart.

Use of coupons has also played a major role in American fast-food success over Chinese chains. While McDonald's and Kentucky's prices are not any cheaper than those of Chinese chains, coupons made their food much more affordable for poor people and increased brand recognition. By spreading coupons around and advertising cheaper deals to Chinese locals, McDonald's and KFC made themselves immediately noticeable to almost every person in urban Chinese settings.

KFC employed an extended menu that contained Chinese food in addition to the food that its American counterparts sell. By doing this it was able to nearly match the items Chinese fast-food restaurants sell while putting an Americanized spin on it that readily drew in Chinese locals. The sheer speed at which KFC expanded also played a major role in its success over nascent Chinese fast food chains. By opening restaurants extremely quickly and strategically placing them in major cities, it overshadowed Chinese chains before they had the chance to develop. KFC usually gives the public an image of a specialist in fried chicken. However, KFC started to add more Chinese food ingredients into its new menu as it entered the Chinese market. KFC is one of the few fast food restaurant that sells breakfast. Congee, egg tarts, and breakfast rice roll are some signature Chinese dishes added to the KFC menu. The company started designing more products that favored local customer's tastes, which made KFC a more competitive fast food company in China. The localization strategy helped KFC reach peak revenue in 2004, making up 46.4% of the fast food market that year.

The fast food industry in China has made many changes to help them adapt to the new market. Flavors and menus are very different compared to those in the U.S. Companies also have new marketing strategies directed toward Chinese customers.

Pizza Hut is one of America's fast food companies that repackaged their brand when they entered the Chinese market. Pizza Hut has an image of being a low priced pizza place in the U.S. However, it has transformed into a medium priced restaurant in China. Pizza Hut in China has added wine lists and a three course menu with fine desserts, which creates a more classic image for the brand. However, the price does not change drastically due to the currency exchange rate.  A meal set for 2 persons is around 189 yuan which is 28 dollars. Pizza Hut has also added Chinese ingredients in their foods to suit Chinese customers’ taste. For example, there is the Beijing duck pizza, Szechuan flavored lobster spaghetti, and bubble tea as a drink option.

The creation of the drive-through was a relatively new concept in its establishment in China in the early 2000s, a time when cars themselves were still somewhat of a novelty for many. It was so new that many individuals did not know how to use it. As of 2008 there were only 26 drive-throughs in China and is something that has gained more awareness over time, but has not increased as much in popularity and availability.

Growth of Fast Food industries over time 
Fast food industries have grown immensely and have significant ties to the rapid economic development that took place in the 1990s to the early 2000s. As of 2013 there are over 2 million fast food restaurants open in China. These range from franchises to independent Chinese style fast food places.

A majority of fast food restaurants opened in China are privately owned (76% as of 2012). Domestic Chinese fast food chains like Malan Noodle compete with large American franchises like KFC and have shown to still have a hold over 43% of the total fast food industry revenue in 2013.

The spread of  fast food in China

First phase: Establishing anchor points (1994–2000) 
In the beginning of their businesses in China, McDonald's and KFC represented the elites of western culture to the Chinese locals. This was because McDonald's and KFC established their first restaurants in high-end shopping centers, office areas, and near universities.

Second phase: Commercial centers and transport hubs (2001–2005) 
As McDonald's and KFC extended their reach to commercial centers and transportation hubs and began to appeal more to pop culture, they extended their reach to young, white-collar and trendy demographics and the fast food enterprises began to appear less foreign to Chinese locals.

Third phase: Daily zones (2006–2012) 
The final phase of the spread of fast food in China occurred when McDonald's and KFC stopped targeting universities and urban hot-spots and began expanding outward and focusing on residential areas. McDonald's and KFC also incorporated more Chinese flavors into their food and reduced American symbolism in their restaurants, making their restaurants seem even less foreign to Chinese locals. With this, eating at American fast food restaurants ceased being something Chinese families did on special occasions and became routine for them.

Health impacts

2000s 
A study conducted by the International Journal of Pediatric Obesity between April and October 2004 compared BMI to fast-food consumption in Chinese children between the ages of 2 and 18 and found that the highest correlation between the two occurred between the ages of 10 and 12. Despite this, they were unable to find very much correlation between fast food and obesity and concluded that increased obesity was largely a result of environment and lifestyle.

A 2005 study by the Obesity Society found that fast-food had not yet spread far enough across China to have resulted in significant rises in obesity. Chinese children generally ate very few meals away from home. While children in urban areas did eat more fast food than those in rural areas, the difference was considerably small.

By the end of the 2000s China has seen an immense growth in obesity rates with 27.8% of children surpassing the standard weight guidelines. Obesity rates of male students in Beijing reached 15%, near doubling their original figures in 1990. These rates have matched the introduction of fast food establishments and have created significant concern for the future health of its citizens.

2010s 
Chinese children statistically consume less fast food than American children, but are becoming increasingly obese, and it is likely that the influx of fast food in China is a contributing factor, even though it might not be the principle culprit. Of those who frequent Chinese fast food institutions the most, the vast majority do so in groups as a social activity. Fast food restaurants are also a hot-spot for birthday parties or hosting social events, furthering the idea of fast food being primarily a social activity. From this, it is reasonable to assume that the Chinese do not necessarily consume fast food because of the convenience and cheap prices that entice Americans. This idea of fast-food restaurants as an exotic social destination draws youth away from Chinese restaurants, coupled with the increased number of fast-food restaurants near transport hubs, could very well be negatively impacting their health. Recent Chinese domestic food scandals have Chinese customers shying away from domestic food, leading to a belief that Western brands hold a higher standard and thus making Western fast food increasingly popular within urban cities.

A study published in 2016 connects the expanding number of Western fast food enterprises in China to rising rates of obesity. Fast food industry revenue in China grew over 600% from 2000 to 2012, accumulating over 94 billion US dollars in 2013. From 2002 to 2012, obesity and overweight rates grew 12% among adults. A cross sectional study on 3,140 students below the age of 15 showed that having lunch in fast food restaurant versus at home was associated with being overweight.

Health Initiatives 
Yum China, the parent brand of KFC, Pizza Hut and Taco Bell have looked into initiatives to separate themselves from their American counterparts by focusing on improving the health of consumers. Yum China will work with state-sponsored health campaigns to raise awareness and build healthy eating habits for their citizens.

Social media 
McDonald's in China in recent decades have established themselves deeply into the lives of many Chinese citizens. As of 2013 KFC and other fast food brands like McDonald's have been under fire for their high usage of antibiotics in their food as they link this to their significant weight gain in their population.

Scandals 
Many Fast food restaurants were impacted by a scandal involving rotten meat from a Shanghai-based factory that have been known to supply food retailers in China such as McDonald's, KFC, Papa John's, and Burger King. McDonald's during this time assured food safety, however weeks later admitted to having imported chicken and pork through the Shanghai distributor.

Instant noodle business in China 

Chinese consumers have a growing appetite for instant noodles; people in China used to eat plenty of instant noodles to save time, but recently, more fast food restaurants have been opening in China. Food delivery apps could represent the biggest threat to instant noodle's resurgence in China. The threat from the food delivery apps severely affects the market of instant noodles, with these apps being one of the main reasons behind the sales decrease in instant noodles. About 730 million people in China now have access to the internet, and around 95% of them are using smartphones. The apps that offer food delivery to your location are replacing Chinese customer's noodles with other foods. Recently, the consumption of instant noodles in China is gradually decreasing due to the popularity of takeaway.

Characteristics
McDonald's in China is generally fairly similar in menu and taste to how it is in the US, but Pizza Hut is considered upscale in China  and KFC offers many locally popular dishes such as fishball soup.

Food Delivery

Convenience 
The rise of food delivery came about as a matter of convenience with many fast food chain restaurants already offering their own delivery courier. This increase in demand was fueled by American delivery companies that have already established themselves at home. They entered the Chinese market in 2010 and as of 2020 have currently doubled the amount of market value than the U.S. holds with the Chinese market producing roughly US$45 billion within this industry. Most Chinese workers work a busy lifestyle referred to as the 996 schedule working from 9:00 am to 9:00 pm, six days a week. As work culture in China is extremely busy, food delivery helps fit in busy schedules for individuals that do not have the time to go out and eat a regular sit down meal. Couponing also fits into this lifestyle as these delivery apps often have options to send coupons to other friends as well as have access to specials that may save them money when ordering food. This further incentivizes users who already have a busy lifestyle and are seeking a bargain when looking for something to eat.

Environmental Concerns 
Many fast food restaurants already offer delivery and continue to see rapid growth in the industry without concern for the environment. The largest contribution to pollution appears to come from those that order food from places that are short delivery routes. As the cost put into the environment does not grow in a linear manner, the shorter routes will always incur higher costs to the environment as the amount of packaging and preparation as well as the carbon that is emitted from delivery drivers differ based on distance traveled.

With the rise of food delivery offered by many restaurants in China, this produces immense amounts of waste as every delivery item comes with disposable containers and single-use chopsticks. This has led to lawsuits over the environmental cost of the food delivery's wastefulness. With this rise of cities and increase of food delivery orders, the ecological impacts could be extremely severe over a course of time. Food delivery in China mostly consists of the use of plastics that are not easily accessible compared to the U.S. where most delivery orders come in biodegradable material like paper or cardboard.

Alternatives 
Companies seek to change their way of production and offer green alternatives when it comes towards the production of take-away materials. The implementation of green supply management will help in the long run in this regard. Some proposed alternatives to further assist in this matter would be not ordering delivery and reducing by walking to short-distance places that are within a walkable distance. This will not only give the individual an opportunity to exercise, but will also reduce the usage of vehicles and amount of packaging that will have to go into deliveries.

Companies are also looking into changing the source of delivery from motorcycles that use gasoline to fleets that run off of electricity. This allows for cleaner modes of transportation and will allow for travel between 40 and 60 km of distance on a single charge. This alternative will give delivery companies options to diversify the way they deliver food.

See also

 Americanization
 Pizza in China

References

Further reading

Chinese cuisine
Globalization by location
Fast food